The Darwin Awards are a tongue-in-cheek honor that originated in Usenet newsgroup discussions around 1985. They recognize individuals who have supposedly contributed to human evolution by selecting themselves out of the gene pool by dying or becoming sterilized via their own actions.

The project became more formalized with the creation of a website in 1993, followed by a series of books starting in 2000 by Wendy Northcutt. The criterion for the awards states: "In the spirit of Charles Darwin, the Darwin Awards commemorate individuals who protect our gene pool by making the ultimate sacrifice of their own lives. Darwin Award winners eliminate themselves in an extraordinarily idiotic manner, thereby improving our species' chances of long-term survival."

Accidental self-sterilization also qualifies, but the site notes: "Of necessity, the award is usually bestowed posthumously." The candidate is disqualified, though, if "innocent bystanders" are killed in the process, as they might have contributed positively to the gene pool. The logical problem presented by award winners who may have already reproduced is not addressed in the selection process owing to the difficulty of ascertaining whether or not a person has children; the Darwin Award rules state that the presence of offspring does not disqualify a nominee.

History

The origin of the Darwin Awards can be traced back to posts on Usenet group discussions as early as 1985. A post on August 7, 1985 describes the awards as being "given posthumously to people who have made the supreme sacrifice to keep their genes out of our pool. Style counts, not everyone who dies from their own stupidity can win." This early post cites an example of a person who tried to break into a vending machine and was crushed to death when he pulled it over himself. This story was later determined to be an urban legend by the Arizona Department of Public Safety. Wendy Northcutt says the official Darwin Awards website run by Northcutt does its best to confirm all stories submitted, listing them as, "confirmed true by Darwin". Many of the viral emails circulating the Internet, however, are hoaxes and urban legends.

The website and collection of books were started in 1993 by Wendy Northcutt, who at the time was a graduate in molecular biology from the University of California, Berkeley. She went on to study neurobiology at Stanford University, doing research on cancer and telomerase. In her spare time, she organised chain letters from family members into the original Darwin Awards website hosted in her personal account space at Stanford. She eventually left the bench in 1998 and devoted herself full-time to her website and books in September 1999. By 2002, the website received 7 million page hits per month.

She encountered some difficulty in publishing the first book, since most publishers would only offer her a deal if she agreed to remove the stories from the internet. Northcutt refused to do so, saying, "It was a community! I could not do that. Even though it might have cost me a lot of money, I kept saying no." She eventually found a publisher who agreed to print a book containing only 10% of the material gathered for the website. The first book turned out to be a success, and was listed on The New York Times best-seller list for 6 months.

Not all of the feedback from the stories Northcutt published was positive, and she occasionally received email from people who knew the deceased. One such person wrote, "This is horrible. It has shocked our community to the core. You should remove this."  Northcutt, though, said, "I can't. It's just too stupid." Northcutt kept the stories on the website and in her books, citing them as a "funny-but-true safety guide", and mentioning that children who read the book are going to be much more careful around explosives.

The website also recognizes, with Honorable Mentions, individuals who survive their misadventures with their reproductive capacity intact. One example of this is Larry Walters, who attached helium-filled weather balloons to a lawn chair and floated far above Long Beach, California, in July 1982. (Walters later fell into depression and committed suicide.) Another notable honorable mention was given to the two men who attempted to burgle the home of footballer Duncan Ferguson (who had an infamous reputation for physical aggression on and off the pitch, including four convictions for assault and who had served six months in Glasgow's Barlinnie Prison) in 2001, with one burglar requiring three days' hospitalisation after being confronted by the player.

A 2014 study published in the British Medical Journal found that between 1995 and 2014, males represented 88.7% of Darwin Award winners (see figure).

A 2006 comedy film, The Darwin Awards, written and directed by Finn Taylor, was based on the website and many of the Darwin Awards stories.

Rules
Northcutt has stated five requirements for a Darwin Award:

Inability to reproduce
Nominee must be dead or rendered sterile

This may be subject to dispute. Potential awardees may be out of the gene pool because of age; others have already reproduced before their deaths. To avoid debates about the possibility of in vitro fertilization, artificial insemination, or cloning, the original Darwin Awards book applied the following "deserted island" test to potential winners: If the person were unable to reproduce when stranded on a deserted island with a fertile member of the opposite sex, he or she would be considered sterile. Winners of the award, in general, either are dead or have become unable to use their sexual organs.

"Excellence"
Astoundingly stupid judgment

The candidate's foolishness must be unique and sensational, likely because the award is intended to be funny. A number of foolish but common activities, such as smoking in bed, are excluded from consideration. In contrast, self-immolation caused by smoking after being administered a flammable ointment in a hospital and specifically told not to smoke is grounds for nomination. One "Honorable Mention" (a man who attempted suicide by swallowing nitroglycerine pills, and then tried to detonate them by running into a wall) is noted to be in this category, despite being intentional and self-inflicted (i.e. attempted suicide), which would normally disqualify the inductee.

Self-selection
Cause of one's own demise

Killing a friend with a hand grenade would not be eligible, but killing oneself while manufacturing a homemade chimney-cleaning device from a grenade would be. To earn a Darwin Award, one must have killed oneself, or rendered oneself sterile; merely causing death to a third party is insufficient.

Maturity
Capable of sound judgement

The nominee must be at least past the legal driving age and free of mental defect (Northcutt considers injury or death caused by mental defect to be tragic, rather than amusing, and routinely disqualifies such entries). After much discussion, a small category regarding deaths below this age limit also exists. Entry into this category requires that the peers of the candidate be of the opinion that the actions of the person in question were above and beyond the limits of reason.

In 2011, however, the awards targeted a 16-year-old boy in Leeds who died stealing copper wiring (the standard minimum driving age in Great Britain being 17). In 2012, Northcutt made similar light of a 14-year-old girl in Brazil who was killed while leaning out of a school bus window, but she was "disqualified" for the award itself because of the likely public objection owing to the girl's age, which Northcutt asserts is based on "magical thinking".

Veracity
Event must be verified

The story must be documented by reliable sources: e.g., reputable newspaper articles, confirmed television reports, or responsible eyewitnesses. If a story is found to be untrue, it is disqualified, but particularly amusing ones are placed in the urban legend section of the archives. Despite this requirement, many of the stories are fictional, often appearing as "original submissions" and presenting no further sources than unverified "eyewitnesses". Most such stories on Northcutt's Darwin Awards site are filed in the Personal Accounts section.

Rules under development
In addition, later revisions to the qualification criteria add several requirements that have not been made into formalized "rules":
 Innocent bystanders cannot be endangered.
 The qualifying event must be caused without deliberate intent to end the nominee's own life (or fertility). (To discourage notoriety-seekers from injuring themselves purposely to win a Darwin.)

Reception 
The Darwin Awards have received varying levels of scrutiny from the scientific community. In his book Encyclopedia of Evolution, biology professor Stanley A. Rice comments: "Despite the tremendous value of these stories as entertainment, it is unlikely that they represent evolution in action", citing the nonexistence of "judgment impairment genes". On an essay in the book The Evolution of Evil, professor Nathan Hallanger acknowledges that the Darwin Awards are meant as black humor, but associates them with the eugenics movement of the early 20th century. University of Oxford biophysicist Sylvia McLain, writing for The Guardian, says that while the Darwin Awards are "clearly meant to be funny", they do not accurately represent how genetics work, further noting that "'smart' people do stupid things all the time". Geologist and science communicator Sharon A. Hill has criticized the Darwin Awards on both scientific and ethical grounds, claiming that no genetic traits impact personal intelligence or good judgment to be targeted by natural selection, and calling them an example of "ignorance" and "heartlessness".  There are now roughly 100 genes thought to be associated with risk taking.

Notable recipients

 The driver of the JATO Rocket Car in the well-known urban legend.
 Garry Hoy who fell from the 24th story of the Toronto-Dominion Centre whilst attempting to demonstrate to a group of students that the windows were unbreakable. His death has been featured in television programs such as 1000 Ways to Die and MythBusters.
 Charles Stephens, the first person to die while attempting to go over Niagara Falls in a barrel.
 Larry Walters was awarded an 'Honorable Mention' for his lawn chair balloon flight into controlled airspace.

Books

See also
 
 List of inventors killed by their own inventions
 
 List of selfie-related injuries and deaths
 List of unusual deaths
 
Schadenfreude
Death by misadventure

References

External links
 

American comedy websites
Ironic and humorous awards
Incompetence
Black comedy
Internet properties established in 1993
Awards established in 1993
1993 establishments in the United States
Evolution